Small Talk (Mandarin: 日常對話) is a 2016 Taiwanese documentary feature film in which the director Huang Hui-chen attempts to reveal and reconcile a painful past shared between herself and her mother A-nu, a lesbian Taoist priestess.

Small Talk world premiered on October 5, 2016 at the 53rd Golden Horse Film Festival and Awards, and was nominated for Best Documentary and Best Editing. Small Talk had its international premiere at the 67th Berlin International Film Festival in the Panorama section, and won the Teddy Award for Best Documentary film. It was selected as the Taiwanese entry for the Best Foreign Language Film at the 90th Academy Awards, but it was not nominated.

Small Talk is executive produced by Hou Hsiao-hsien.

Themes 
The film is a meditative exploration into Huang and her mother A-nu's past, each layer revealing a little more about who A-nu is, as a Taoist priestess, a lover to many girlfriends, a dependable friend, and an absentee mother. It is the identify of a mother that Huang wants to understand, since A-nu has made it clear that she never wanted to get married nor have children.

Through sit-down interviews, often ending in silence, Huang attempts to break down the wall that stands between herself and her mother for the past 20 years. The film also incorporate interviews with A-nu's past and present lovers, A-nu's siblings, as well as home video shot over the course of the last 20 years to weave a tapestry of a daughter's vague understanding of her lesbian mom.

The ultimate reveal comes when Huang finally summons up the courage to have the talk with A-nu, which will either free Huang and A-nu from their shared painful past, or may further estrange them.

Release 
Small Talk was theatrically released in Taiwan on April 14, 2017 by Mirror Stage Films.

Critical response 
Small Talk world premiered at the 53rd Golden Horse Film Festival in Taiwan to critical acclaim, holding onto the number one spot for Audience Choice Award, beating out Edward Yang's A Brighter Summer Day for two consecutive weeks, before taking second place.

Awards 
On February 17, 2017, Small Talk was awarded the Teddy Award for Best Documentary Film at the Berlin Film Festival.

The Teddy Award jurors stated:Small Talk is the director's courageous portrayal of her family story, which gives an audience an inside look at a culture that we might not be familiar with. This powerful documentary manages to be of universal significance and extremely intimate at the same time. 

Small Talk was also nominated for Best Documentary and Best Editing at the 53rd Golden Horse Awards.

In July 2017, the film won Best Documentary at the 19th Taipei Film Awards.

It was nominated for Best Film at the 17th Chinese Film Media Awards.

See also
 List of submissions to the 90th Academy Awards for Best Foreign Language Film
 List of Taiwanese submissions for the Academy Award for Best Foreign Language Film

References

External links 
 

2016 films
Taiwanese documentary films
Taiwanese-language films
Taiwanese LGBT-related films
Films about families
Documentary films about LGBT topics
2016 LGBT-related films
Lesbian-related films